Tano Cimarosa, real name Gaetano Cisco, (1 January 1922 – 24 May 2008) was an Italian actor, screenwriter and film director. He participated in more than fifty movies.

He played the "Blacksmith" in the Oscar-winning film Cinema Paradiso from 1988. He is known to horror film fans for directing Reflections in Black in 1975.

Selected filmography

The Eye of the Needle (1962) - Umberto
Mare matto (1963)
The Two Parachutists (1965) - Garcia's aide
Due mafiosi contro Al Capone (1966) - Gangster
I nostri mariti (1966) - The Sicilian Neighbour of Attilia (segment "Il marito di Attilia") (uncredited)
The Long, the Short, the Cat (1967) - Il metronotte
The Day of the Owl (1968) - Zecchinetta
May God Forgive You... But I Won't (1968) - Chico
Suicide Commandos (1968) - Calleya
Be Sick... It's Free (1968) - Salvatore Laganà-Father of 9 children
La morte sull'alta collina (1969) - General Valiente
Bootleggers (1969) - Mancho
The Tough and the Mighty (1969) - Cartana
Police Chief Pepe (1969) - Agente Cariddi 
The Most Beautiful Wife (1970) - Gaetano Cimarosa
A Sword for Brando (1970) - Greedy friar
Crepa padrone, crepa tranquillo (1970)
Between Miracles (1971) - Zi' Checco
La Poudre d'escampette (1971) - Un soldat italien sur la plage
In Prison Awaiting Trial (1971) - Un secondino
A Girl in Australia (1971) - Emigrante italiano
Stanza 17-17 palazzo delle tasse, ufficio imposte (1971) - Police Commissioner 
Delirio caldo (1972) - John Lacey 'Crocchetta'
Così sia (1972) - Chaco, Gang Boss
Italian Graffiti (1973) - Puddu Campolia
Riti, magie nere e segrete orge nel trecento... (1973) - (scenes deleted)
Gang War in Milan (1973) - Nino Balsamo
Oremus, alleluia e così sia (1973) - Chaco
Bread and Chocolate (1974) - Gigi
Unbelievable Adventures of Italians in Russia (1974) - Rosario Agrò
 Pasqualino Cammarata, Frigate Captain (1974) - Patanò
How to Kill a Judge (1975) - Tano Barra - l'assistente di parcheggio
L'ammazzatina (1975) - Pasqualino Mosco
Il fidanzamento (1975) - Man in the movie (uncredited)
Reflections in Black (1975) - Sgt. Pantò
The Exorcist: Italian Style (1975) - Turi Randazzo
Free Hand for a Tough Cop (1976) - Cravatta
L'Italia in pigiama (1977) - Il padre incestuoso
Death Hunt (1977) - Tano
A Man on His Knees (1979) - Sebastiano Colicchia
Café Express (1980) - Panepino, maresciallo Polfer
Uomini di parola (1981) - Gaetano Frasca
Sfrattato cerca casa equo canone (1983) - Massimo
Sicilian Connection (1987) - Don Michele
Faida (1988)
Cinema Paradiso (1988) - Blacksmith
The Dark Sun (1990)
Boys on the Outside (1990) - Capo-cantiere
C'è posto per tutti (1990)
La Sarrasine (1992) - Pasquale Lopinto
La discesa di Aclà a Floristella (1992)
Anni 90: Parte II (1993) - Mimì Cantalamessa
A Pure Formality (1994) - Servant
Italia Village (1994)
The Star Maker (1995) - Grandpa Bordonaro
Spot (1999)
Una milanese a Roma (2001)
Two Friends (2002) - Pensionato
L'anno mille (2008) - Custode (final film role)

As director
Reflections in Black (1975) aka Vice Wears Black Hose
Death Hunt  (1977, also  writer)

Biography
Luigia Miniucchi, Il mondo di Tano Cimarosa. 50 anni di cinema italiano, By Bess Edizioni, 2006. 160 pages.

References

External links
 

1922 births
2008 deaths
Italian male film actors
Italian film directors
20th-century Italian screenwriters
Giallo film directors
Italian male screenwriters
Actors from Messina
20th-century Italian male writers